Ahmed Muhammad Helmy Abdel Rahman Awwad (born November 19, 1969) is an Egyptian actor, comedian, film producer, TV host and diplomat. He started his career in 1993 on the Egyptian satellite broadcast in a program called Leib Eyal. In 1998, he made his first movie Aboud Ala El Hedoud.

Early life 
Helmy was born in Banha, Qalyubiyya Governorate. He is the middle child between 3 siblings: Khaled, Ahmed and Sally. He traveled to the Kingdom of Saudi Arabia at the age of six due to his father's work there. He lived in Jeddah for 10 years before returning to Egypt and studied there. Helmy graduated from the Higher institute of Dramatic Arts in Egypt, from the decoration department. Ahmed also graduated from the Egyptian Academy of Arts in 1993.

Career 

Helmy has starred in 18 films, one series and participated in a play. He has won awards, including Damascus International Film Festival Award for Best Actor. He has presented programs, including Leib Eyal, Darbaka, Mn Sairbah El-Bonbon, Sawayet Eyal and Helmy Online.

As an actor and performer, Helmy is notable for his fast-thinking and witty comedy. His career in mainstream Egyptian film began when director Sherif Arafa spotted him on the children's program Leib Eyal (Kids' Play) on the Egyptian Satellite Broadcast. Sherif found in him the comedian actor he was looking for to star his film, Aboud Ala El Hedoud (Aboud at the Frontier). In that film, Helmy made his first big screen appearance, co-starring alongside Alaa Wali El Din. Thereafter, he quickly made a jump to leading roles in films such as Omar 2000, El Nazer (The Headmaster), Elsellem Wel Te'ban (Snakes and Ladders).

In 2007, Helmy topped the Egyptian comedian market in the number of audience and revenue, mostly due to the success of his movie Keda Reda.

Helmy was a judge on the Arab talent show for its third season. He joins the Lebanese singer Najwa Karam, the Lebanese journalist and TV personality Ali Jaber, and the Saudi comedian Nasser Al Qasabi. He participated in the seasons: 4, 5 and 6.

Personal life 
In 2002, Helmy married Egyptian actress Mona Zaki. They have 3 children: Lily (2003), Saleem (2014) and Younis (2016).

Helmy is the founder of Shadows Communications and the author of the book 28 Harf.

He was diagnosed with cancer and was treated in 2014 by removing the tumor from a muscle in his back.

Helmy has previously collaborated with the United Nations World Food Programme (WFP) to help promote its "Food for Education" project, launched in association with the "Chipsy" food products company.

Filmography

References 

Ambassadors of supra-national bodies
Egyptian male film actors
Egyptian male television actors
Egyptian male stage actors
Egyptian male voice actors
Egyptian film producers
Egyptian comedians
Living people
World Food Programme people
20th-century Egyptian male actors
21st-century Egyptian male actors
1969 births
People from Benha